Chulung (Chɨlɨng) is a Kirati languages spoken in Ankhisalla VDC, Dhankuta District, Koshi Zone, Nepal.

References

Kiranti languages
Languages of Nepal
Languages of Koshi Province